Aedh Ua Flaithbheartaigh (died 1079) was King of Iar Connacht.

Biography

Aedh was the third bearer of the surname Ua Flaithbheartaigh to rule over the Muintir Murchada, and apparently the second since their forcible expulsion from Maigh Seola by the Ua Conchobhair in 1051. He was killed in 1079 by Ruaidrí na Saide Buide. For this action, King Toirdelbach Ua Briain of Munster raided Connacht and expelled Ruaidrí.

A notice of the death of his grandson in 1091 says Aedh's father was Ruaidhri Ua Flaithbheartaigh, who had been killed in the battle of Glen Patrick in 1061.

See also
 Ó Flaithbertaigh

References
 West or H-Iar Connaught Ruaidhrí Ó Flaithbheartaigh, 1684 (published 1846, ed. James Hardiman).
 Origin of the Surname O'Flaherty, Anthony Matthews, Dublin, 1968, p. 40.
 Irish Kings and High-Kings, Francis John Byrne (2001), Dublin: Four Courts Press, 
 Annals of Ulster at CELT: Corpus of Electronic Texts at University College Cork
 Byrne, Francis John (2001), Irish Kings and High-Kings, Dublin: Four Courts Press, 

People from County Galway
1079 deaths
Aedh
11th-century Irish monarchs
Year of birth unknown